The End of the Game may refer to:

Music
 The End of the Game, a 1970 album by Peter Green
 End of the Game, a 1980 song by The Knack from ...But the Little Girls Understand
 The End of the Game, a 2019 song by Weezer from Van Weezer
 A 1999 Song by Sting from the recordings of Brand New Day

Other
 The End of the Game (1919 film)
 The End of the Game (1975 film)
 The End of the Game, a 1986 novel by Sheri S. Tepper